Kariz-e Geli (also Romanized as Kārīz-e Gelī) is a village in Safaiyeh Rural District, in the Central District of Zaveh County, Razavi Khorasan Province, Iran. At the 2006 census, its population was 170, in 35 families.

References 

Populated places in Zaveh County